2C-B-BUTTERFLY (2C-B-MOTH-BIKHIR, 2C-B-BFLY) is a conformationally-restricted derivative of the phenethylamine hallucinogen 2C-B, which was discovered in 1999 by Michael S. Whiteside and Aaron Monte. It is a ring-expanded homologue of the better known compound 2C-B-FLY, and has similar properties as an agonist for serotonin receptors, but with more selectivity for 5-HT2C over 5-HT2A.

Analogues and derivatives

Legal Status
2C-B-BUTTERFLY is illegal in Latvia.

See also 
 Bromo-DragonFLY
 βk-2C-B
 2C-D-5-EtO

References 

Bromoarenes
2C (psychedelics)
Serotonin receptor agonists
Heterocyclic compounds with 3 rings
Oxygen heterocycles